Playa de Los Ladrillos is a beach in the municipality of Algeciras, southeastern Spain. It overlooks the Bay of Algeciras, next to Playa del Barranco. It is about 200 metres in length.

Algeciras
Beaches of Andalusia
Geography of the Province of Cádiz